Mark Garfield "Moxie" Manuel (October 16, 1881 – April 26, 1924), was a professional baseball player who pitched in the Major Leagues from 1905 to 1908.

Biography
He played for the Washington Senators and Chicago White Sox. He was born in Metropolis, Illinois on October 16, 1881, and was Jewish.

After leaving the major leagues, he played second base for several amateur teams. He lived in Pascola and Hayti, Missouri and ran a mercantile business in Pascola.

He died at St. Joseph's Hospital in Memphis, Tennessee on April 26, 1924.

References

External links

 

1881 births
1924 deaths
Washington Senators (1901–1960) players
Chicago White Sox players
Major League Baseball pitchers
Baseball players from Illinois
People from Metropolis, Illinois
Jewish American baseball players
Jewish Major League Baseball players